The Monastery of Our Lady of Mount Carmel ("the Carmelite monastery") was a small Catholic monastery of Carmelite nuns in Espoo, Finland, established in 1988 by sisters from the Carmelite monastery in San Rafael, California. The community latterly consisted of six nuns.

The last of the nuns left Finland in 2021, when the monastery was closed.

See also
 List of Christian monasteries in Finland

References

Catholic Church in Finland
1988 establishments in Finland
Carmelite monasteries in Finland